The ticking doradito (Pseudocolopteryx citreola) is a species of bird in the family Tyrannidae. It is found in swamps and riparian habitats in central Chile and western Argentina.

References

ticking doradito
Birds of Chile
Birds of Argentina
ticking doradito
ticking doradito